Gary Brabin (born 9 December 1970) is an English former professional footballer, coach and manager who is the Sporting Director at Cymru Premier team The New Saints.

A midfielder with a 12-year career in the English Football League, he represented Stockport County, Doncaster Rovers, Bury, Blackpool, Lincoln City, Hull City and Torquay United. He also played non-league football for Gateshead, Runcorn, Boston United, Chester City, Halifax Town, Southport and Burscough, and also played in the Welsh Premier League for Total Network Solutions / The New Saints. He was named as Chester City's Player of the Year in 2001–02, and also won three caps for the England C team.

He later went into coaching, firstly with Burscough and The New Saints, before he was appointed manager at Southport in April 2008. Two months later he went on to be named as Cambridge United manager, and despite being named as Conference Premier Manager of the Year for 2008–09, was sacked in July 2009. He later scouted for and coached at Luton Town, before he was promoted to first team manager in March 2011. He led the club to the Conference play-off final two months later, which ended in defeat, and he was sacked in March 2012. He returned to Southport as manager in October 2014, before again leaving the club three months later to work as a coach at Everton. He was appointed manager at Tranmere Rovers in May 2015, before being sacked in September 2016. He joined Port Vale as a coach in October 2017, and was appointed assistant manager at Blackpool 11 months later. In June 2019, he returned to Luton Town as the club's assistant manager for the 2019–20 season.

Playing career

Early career
Brabin began his senior career with Fourth Division side Stockport County, making three appearances under Danny Bergara during the 1989–90 season. He played just one further match at Edgeley Park in the 1990–91 campaign, before leaving the "Hatters" and dropping into the Northern Premier League with Tony Lee's Gateshead following a successful loan period at the Gateshead International Stadium. He then left the "Tynesiders" and joined Conference club Runcorn, who struggled in the 1991–92 and 1992–93 seasons, before he helped the "Linnets" to a fifth-place finish in 1993–94. He also made two appearances at Wembley Stadium in the 1993 and 1994 FA Trophy finals as Runcorn lost out 4–1 to Wycombe Wanderers and then 2–1 to Woking. He worked as a bouncer during his time at Runcorn.

Doncaster Rovers and Bury
Brabin departed Canal Street and made a return to the Football League after being signed by Doncaster Rovers manager Sammy Chung for a £45,000 fee in July 1994. He also played three games for the England C team against Wales, Finland and Norway. He went on to score eight goals from 33 appearances for "Donny" throughout the 1994–95 season. He added three goals from 34 games in the 1995–96 campaign, before he left Belle Vue and was moved on to Stan Ternent's Bury for a £125,000 fee in March 1996. He featured just five times for the "Shakers" during his time at Gigg Lane.

Blackpool
Brabin joined Blackpool for the 1996–97 season for a £200,000 fee, and scored two goals from 38 matches as manager Gary Megson led the "Tangerines" to a seventh-place finish in the Second Division. He also enjoyed a brief spell on loan at Lincoln City, featuring in five games for John Reames's "Imps" in a brief stay at Sincil Bank. However he was arrested in September 1997 after an alleged assault on Brentford captain Jamie Bates. An FA disciplinary committee later found him guilty of 'ungentlemanly and improper behaviour' and fined him £500 and banned him for two matches to run consecutively with a three-match ban he picked up for accumulating 21 disciplinary points. He scored a further three goals from 29 appearances during the 1997–98 season, as player-manager Nigel Worthington led the "Seasiders" to a 12th-place finish. He played ten games at the start of the 1998–99 season, before leaving Bloomfield Road to join Hull City at the bottom of the Third Division in January 1999.

Hull City
Player-manager Warren Joyce organised a turnaround in the "Tigers" form, as the club salvaged their Football League status with a 21st-place finish at the end of the 1998–99 season, with Brabin contributing four goals from his 23 appearances. Hull then posted a 14th-place finish in the 1999–2000 campaign, with Brabin scoring three goals in his 45 appearances despite struggling with a neck injury. Brian Little then took charge as manager and led Hull to the play-offs at the end of the 2000–01 season, with Brabin again a key first-team player having made 43 appearances and contributed two goals. However they were beaten by Leyton Orient in the play-off semi-finals and Brabin departed Boothferry Park after accepting a severance payment for the remaining year of his contract in August 2001.

Later career
After leaving Hull, Brabin trained with St. Johnstone and had trials at Plymouth Argyle, Torquay United, Dundee and Dundee United. He went on to return to the Conference for the 2001–02 season, though played just once for Steve Evans's Boston United after joining on non-contract terms, playing the first hour of a 4–1 win over Hayes at York Street. He left the "Pilgrims" to make a return to the Third Division with Torquay United. He played seven games for Roy McFarland's "Gulls", before he had his contract at Plainmoor cancelled after failing to settle on the coast; he had been sent off against former club Hull City in his second appearance and sent off again in a 2–0 defeat to local rivals Exeter City after elbowing Martin Barlow in the face. He returned to the Conference to score three goals in 17 appearances for Chester City. Despite joining the "Seals" relatively late on in the campaign, he was named as Chester City's Player of the Season as the helped the "Blues" to avoid relegation.

Brabin left the Deva Stadium and then signed with Total Network Solutions, and scored six goals in 30 Welsh Premier League matches in the 2002–03 campaign, as TNS finished as runners-up to Barry Town. Ken McKenna's Saints again finished second in 2003–04, this time behind Rhyl, as Brabin scored just once from his 18 appearances. He retired on medical advice in February 2004 after suffering from breathlessness. He then went on to serve Witton Albion as assistant manager. He returned to playing in the Conference National to feature in four games for Chris Wilder's Halifax Town during the 2005–06 campaign, scoring one goal for the "Shaymen". Later in the season he left The Shay and signed for Southport, and played 14 Conference matches. In November 2006, he signed for Northern Premier League side Burscough, where he assisted with coaching in addition to his playing duties. In June 2007, Brabin was appointed as assistant manager of The New Saints, and also played two games at Park Hall in the 2007–08 season.

Style of play
Brabin was a midfielder, but could also play at centre back due to his heading ability. He had a poor disciplinary record.

Coaching career

Southport
On 8 April 2008, Brabin was appointed manager of Southport on a contract running until the end of the 2007–08 season, replacing Peter Davenport. He guided the "Sandgrounders" into the Conference North play-offs, where they were beaten by Stalybridge Celtic in the penalty shoot-out after a 2–2 aggregate draw over the two legs of the semi-final.

Cambridge United
On 23 June 2008, Brabin was named as manager of Cambridge United on a two-year contract, taking over from Jimmy Quinn. He led the "U's" to runners-up spot in the Conference at the end of the 2008–09 season, finishing just two points behind Burton Albion. United defeated Stevenage Borough in the play-off semi-finals, but were beaten 2–0 by Torquay United in the play-off final at Wembley Stadium. The following month he was named as the Conference Premier Manager of the Year. However he was sacked from his post at the Abbey Stadium on 13 July 2009 following a series of disputes with the club's board.

Luton Town
Brabin was appointed as chief scout at Luton Town in October 2009. In May 2010, he was named as Luton's assistant manager, taking over from Alan Neilson.

He was promoted to manager at Kenilworth Road until the end of the 2010–11 season after Richard Money left the club on 28 March 2011. Brabin secured Luton's place in the Conference Premier play-offs, leading them to a 5–1 aggregate victory over Wrexham in the semi-finals. In the final at the City of Manchester Stadium, Luton drew 0–0 after extra-time with AFC Wimbledon, and eventually lost 4–3 in a penalty shootout that left the club facing a third year at non-league level. Brabin received the full support from the Luton board despite the disappointment of the defeat and, one week later, he signed a new two-year contract to stay as permanent manager.

Brabin was sacked on 31 March 2012 after the team fell out of the play-off positions with seven games remaining of the 2011–12 season. His successor, Paul Buckle, led the "Hatters" to the 2012 Conference Premier play-off Final on 20 May, where they were beaten by York City. Ironically, just five days later Brabin was convicted of using threatening and behaviour, but cleared of assault, following an altercation with two stewards after he was sent to the stands during a match at York City on 19 April 2011.

Return to Southport
Brabin returned to Southport for the third time on 6 October 2014, replacing Martin Foyle. He took the club to an FA Cup Third Round tie with Derby County and up to 20th in the Conference. On 20 January 2015, Brabin left Southport to take up a post at Everton to be part of the coaching set up at the under-21 level. His successor at Haig Avenue, Paul Carden, led Southport to a 19th-place finish at the end of the 2014–15 season.

Tranmere Rovers
On 5 May 2015, Brabin was appointed as the manager of Tranmere Rovers following their relegation to the National League. He guided Rovers to a sixth-place finish at the end of the 2015–16 season, missing out on the play-offs by just two points. Two of his signings, Andy Cook and James Norwood, would go on to form a highly effective partnership for the club over the following two seasons. He was named as the National League Manager of the Month for August 2016. However his contract at Prenton Park was terminated on 18 September 2016, with the club in fifth-place but in poor form and his relationship with the club's supporters remaining consistently tense. He was succeeded by Micky Mellon, who led Tranmere to the 2017 National League play-off Final, where they were beaten by Forest Green Rovers.

Return to coaching
Brabin was appointed as a coach at EFL League Two side Port Vale by newly appointed manager Neil Aspin in October 2017. In March 2018, he was named as second favourite to take the management position at Wrexham. In September 2018 he left Vale Park to take up the position as assistant manager to Terry McPhillips at EFL League One side Blackpool. He stepped down from the role for "personal reasons" in March 2019. In June 2019, he returned to Luton as one of Graeme Jones's two assistant managers. Brabin departed Luton in March 2020 following Jones's dismissal.

In April 2021, he was appointed as the Sporting Director at Cymru Premier team The New Saints.

Career statistics

Managerial statistics

Honours

As a player
Individual
Chester City Player of the Year: 2001–02

Runcorn 
FA Trophy runner-up: 1993 & 1994

As a manager
Individual
Conference Premier Manager of the Year: 2008–09
National League Manager of the Month: August 2016

References

1970 births
Living people
Footballers from Liverpool
English footballers
England semi-pro international footballers
Association football midfielders
Association football defenders
Stockport County F.C. players
Gateshead F.C. players
Runcorn F.C. Halton players
Doncaster Rovers F.C. players
Bury F.C. players
Blackpool F.C. players
Lincoln City F.C. players
Hull City A.F.C. players
Boston United F.C. players
Torquay United F.C. players
Chester City F.C. players
The New Saints F.C. players
Halifax Town A.F.C. players
Southport F.C. players
Burscough F.C. players
English Football League players
Northern Premier League players
National League (English football) players
Cymru Premier players
English football managers
Southport F.C. managers
Cambridge United F.C. managers
Luton Town F.C. managers
Tranmere Rovers F.C. managers
National League (English football) managers
Association football coaches
Association football scouts
Luton Town F.C. non-playing staff
Everton F.C. non-playing staff
Port Vale F.C. non-playing staff
Blackpool F.C. non-playing staff
The New Saints F.C. non-playing staff